The Bardahessiagh Formation is a geologic formation in Northern Ireland. It has been described from a locality lying about 3 km NNE of Pomeroy, south of Craigbardahessiagh. It is now known as comprising the former ‘Bardahessiagh Formation’, or Bardahessiagh Beds and the ‘Junction Beds’ that is underlain by a stratigraphical unit not recognised, until fieldwork by the Ulster Museum staff in 1992. The Bardahessiagh Formation is divided into three units, but the summit of the formation is not known. Field evidence indicates that the local top of the formation is characterised by a thrust contact with the Killey Bridge and Tirnaskea Formation (upper Katian and Hirnantian, respectively), exposed south of the Well Field, which lies 650 metres SSW of Craigbardahessiagh.

Constraints on the age of the formation is based on the brachiopod faunas and an upper Sandbian to lower Katian age has been proposed.

The Bardahessiagh Formation preserves a diverse and well-preserved assemblage of fossils. Only the brachiopods, cephalopods, bivalves  and kilbuchophyllid corals  have been systematically described.

Based on the brachiopod faunas, the Bardahessiagh Formation has been interpreted as deposited in a transgressive regime, below storm-wave base environments, peaking in the second unit, with the presence of typical Sericoidea association (Candela 2001, 2006).

The integrity of the formation is currently endangered by excavation by locals using trenchers to dig irrigation ditches.

See also

 List of fossiliferous stratigraphic units in Northern Ireland

References

 

Ordovician Northern Ireland
Ordovician southern paleotropical deposits